The Waikohu River is located in the northeast of New Zealand's North Island. A tributary of the Waipaoa River, it rises close to Matawai  in the Raukumara Range and flows southeast, reaching the Waipaoa River close to the tiny settlement of Puha, between the settlements of Waikohu and Te Karaka.

Rivers of the Gisborne District
Rivers of New Zealand